Bandhak is a South Asian American film directed by Hyder Bilgrami and produced by Ramzan Lakhani. It explores the theme of racism against South Asians in the United States in the aftermath of the September 11 attacks in 2001 through the story of Baldev Singh, an Indian immigrant in New York City who, facing harassment in his workplace, takes his boss hostage with a toy gun.

Critical response 
Bandhak received media coverage in both the United States and India; it was first screened at a California film festival on September 11, 2004, and was brought to India by the Indo-American Art Council. A press release from the distributor Digimax Studio describes it as the first Hindi film in the United States. One New Jersey film critic likened it to a South Asian version of Do The Right Thing. Producer Ramzan Lakhani described his motivation behind the film in an interview with a local New Jersey newspaper, stating that while second generation South Asian youth were producing many films in the United States, he hoped to target the immigrant first generation, and hence tried to tailor the film to Indian sensibilities, including Bollywood-style dance numbers and the use of Hindi.

Credits

Cast 
 Farokh Daruwala
 Murtuza Sabir
 Daman Arora
 Manoj Shinde
 Meenu Mangal
 Ramzan Lakhani

Director 
 Hyder Bilgrami

Producer 
 Ramzan Lakhani

Music 
 Shyam-Das
 Nicholas Noor

See also
List of cultural references to the September 11 attacks

References

External links 
 
 

2003 films
Films based on the September 11 attacks
2000s Hindi-language films
Films about race and ethnicity
Films set in the United States